Self Care is the debut studio album by Australian rock band Yours Truly, released on 18 September 2020 through UNFD.

Recording
Recording sessions for the album were held at Electric Sun Studios and took place throughout 2019 and 2020; the band and Stevie Knight produced the album. Knight also acted as engineer and handled recording, with assistance from Craig Wilkinson. James Paul Wisner mixed the recordings at Wisner Productions while Grant Berry mastered the album at Fader Mastering.

Release and promotion
The album was confirmed by the band's publicist on 16 April 2020, alongside the release of the lead single; before later being officially announced on 7 July 2020, alongside the release of the second single. Into the Pit described the album artwork as featuring "an embroided anatomical heart". The cover was designed by Georgia Maloney.

The album was preceded by four singles: lead single "Composure", released on 16 April 2020, "Together", released on 7 July 2020, "Undersize", released on 4 August 2020, "Funeral Home", released on 3 September 2020  and "Siamese Souls", released on May 12, 2021. 

On 17 July 2020, Yours Truly performed live on Triple J's Like a Version segment, performing a cover of Oasis's "Don't Look Back in Anger" and their track "Composure".

Reception

Writing for Tone Deaf, journalist Tyler Jenke described the album as "an important release for this exceptional outfit, and one that will resonate for years to come."

Wall of Sound felt that the album represented the band "stepping up onto a comfortable pedestal" and additionally called the album "a breath of fresh air for any music fan."

Depth Mags Andrew Cauchi called the album "a fearless charge into stardom for one of Australia's most promising talents". Cauchi additionally thought the album "[declared] the band's credentials on the global stage" and likened it to Avril Lavigne and Kelly Clarkson's early 2000s releases.

Noizzes Will Marshall stated: "Listening to Self Care feels like going through life with your best friend by your side, a supportive companion to get you through the toughest times with empathy and levity." Marshall added: "This album... should make Yours Truly the pop-punk superstars they deserve to be."

Into the Pits Sian Wilkins praised the album, writing: "Yours Truly literally threw this album at the industry as a force to be reckoned with: it adds to their catalogue of flawless material and demonstrates their growth as an outfit."

Self Care debuted and peaked at number 19 on the ARIA Albums Chart for the chart dated 28 September 2020. The following week, the album fell more than thirty-one places into the lower fifty.

Accolades

Track listing
Adapted from Apple Music. All music written by Yours Truly, all lyrics by Mikaila Delgado.

Personnel
Adapted from the album's liner notes.

Yours Truly
 Mikaila Delgado – lead vocals
 Lachlan Cronin – guitar
 Teddie Winder-Haron – guitar
 Bradley Cronan – drums

Production and design
 Stevie Knight – recording, engineer, producer
 Craig Wilkinson – assistance
 James Paul Wisner – mixing
 Grant Berry – mastering
 Yours Truly – producer
 Georgia Moloney – art, direction

Charts

Release history

References

2020 debut albums
Yours Truly (band) albums
UNFD albums